"New Ways to Die" is a 2008, six-issue Spider-Man story arc written by Dan Slott with art by John Romita, Jr. and published by Marvel Comics. The arc first appeared in The Amazing Spider-Man #568-#573.

Plot summary
The Thunderbolts led by Norman Osborn/Green Goblin come to New York City to hunt down the fugitive Spider-Man, who has been framed for a series of murders. Meanwhile, at the F.E.A.S.T. shelter run by Martin Li (Mister Negative), the cancer-ridden Eddie Brock is miraculously healed. When the Thunderbolts track Spider-Man to the F.E.A.S.T. shelter, Brock reacts to the Venom Symbiote (currently bonded to Mac Gargan), transforming into Anti-Venom (a hero with the ability to heal others and purify diseases). Now able to destroy every kind of sickness, he attacks Venom and cures him which destroys most of his symbiote.  Spider-Man and Anti-Venom team up to take down the Thunderbolts. Anti-Venom fights Venom in a new, improved scorpion armor from Norman Osborn. "Venorpion" hits Anti-Venom with his stinger and injects a super-poisonous toxin into him that dissolves his suit. After a battle which results in a building collapsing, Songbird tells Spider-Man to lie low for the next few days. Osborn then holds a press conference, saying that Spider-Man has died in the collapse. At the end of the book, Eddie's suit later reforms.

Collected editions

Reception
Amazing Spider-Man #568 sold 82,540 copies, the 7th best selling comics of August 2008. Amazing Spider-Man #573 sold 93,346 copies or 8th for October 2008. IGN gave the first issue of the arc an 8.0 out of 10 and the last issue 6.4.

See also
Spider-Man: Brand New Day
Kraven's First Hunt

References

External links
Spider-Man: New Ways to Die at Marvel.com

Interview with Dan Slott about Amazing Spider-Man:New Ways to Die

2008 comics debuts
Green Goblin